Timothy Floyd Fuller (born February 7, 1978) is the Vice President of Recruiting and Player Personnel at Overtime Elite. He is the former associate head basketball coach at the University of Missouri. He has worked as an assistant coach under Ernie Nestor, Skip Prosser, Ed Cooley, Rick Pitino, Frank Haith and Kim Anderson.

Education
Fuller attended Woodbridge Senior High School. He graduated in 2000 with a bachelor's degree in communications from Wake Forest University, where he played on the men's basketball team.

Career
In 2010, while working at a basketball camp in China, Fuller was offered and accepted an assistant coach position for the University of Louisville men's college basketball.

In April 2012, Fuller was named associate coach of the University of Missouri men's basketball program.

He was named one of college basketball's Top 10 assistant coaches under the age of 40 by ESPN.com in May 2012.

He also worked as a Nike pro sports representative.

With Missouri Basketball coach Frank Haith suspended for the start of the 2013–14 basketball season Missouri's associate head coach Tim Fuller got a chance to be the head coach for the first five games.  In his first game filling in he coached the Tigers to an 89–53 victory over Southeastern Louisiana starting the season 1–0. He would go on to coach the team to four more victories defeating Southern Illinois (72–59), Hawai'i (92–80), Gardner-Webb (72–63), and IUPUI (78–64) finishing the five games of Haith's suspension 5–0.

In May 2015, Harris-Stowe State University in St. Louis hired Fuller as an advisor on athletic matters to the university president.

Head coaching record

(*) Interim Head coach

References

External links
Missouri bio
Louisville bio
Wake Forest bio

1978 births
Living people
Basketball coaches from Pennsylvania
Basketball players from Pennsylvania
Elon Phoenix men's basketball coaches
Fairfield Stags men's basketball coaches
High school basketball coaches in the United States
Louisville Cardinals men's basketball coaches
Missouri Tigers men's basketball coaches
North Carolina A&T Aggies men's basketball coaches
Wake Forest Demon Deacons men's basketball coaches
Wake Forest Demon Deacons men's basketball players
American men's basketball players